The 1949–50 Ranji Trophy was the 16th season of the Ranji Trophy. Baroda won the title defeating Holkar in the final.

Highlights
 Vijay Hazare scored 130 and 101 in the final, following his 98 and 115 in the 1948–49 final.

Zonal Matches

West Zone

North Zone

East Zone

South Zone

Inter-Zonal Knockout matches

Final
Baroda entered the final for the third successive season, following a win against Holkar in the 1947–48 season and a loss to Bombay in 1948–49 edition.

References

External links
 Ranji Trophy, 1949-50 at ESPNcricinfo
 

1950 in Indian cricket
Indian domestic cricket competitions